Andy Seto (born 3 June 1969) is a comic artist who specialises in martial-arts based stories.

Biography
Seto's works include his main series, "Cyber Weapon Z." He has also drawn a graphic novel adaptation of the earlier Crouching Tiger, Hidden Dragon novels, the King of Fighters series, and also created a graphic novelisation of Stephen Chow's film, Shaolin Soccer. His other work includes: Saint Legend, a story about the Eight Taoist Immortals, Story of The Tao, Dog Story, Para Para, The Four Constables, and Sword Kill.

Bibliography

Comics
108 Fighters
Ape's God
City of Darkness (comic)
City of Darkness 2
Crouching Tiger, Hidden Dragon
Crouching Tiger, Hidden Dragon II
Cyber Weapon Z
Cyber Weapon Z II
Devil United
Ice Fantasy
Para Para
Saint Legend
Saint Warrior
SD Cyber Weapon Z (executive producer)
Shaolin Soccer
Skyliner
Skyliner II
Story of the Tao
Street Fighter The Comic Series (Stage 10)
Bu Dong Quan Z
The Four Constables
The Four Constables-Secret of the Delirium Dagger
The Great Helmsman
The King of Fighters 2000
The King of Fighters 2000 OX
The King of Fighters R (editor)
The King of Fighters Zillion
Woon Swee Oan Qun Xia Zhuan
Woon Swee Oan Qun Xia Zhuan 2

Art books
Andy Seto Art Work Illustrations
Andy Seto Art Work Illustrations 2011
Andy Seto RESTART
Cyber Weapon Z IMPOSSIBLE
How to Art

References

Andy Seto at Lambiek's Comiclopedia

External links 
Interview with Andy Seto
List of Andy Seto works @ MarsImport

Living people
1969 births
Chinese comics artists